Eiserne Bridge (German: Eiserne Brücke) is a bridge in Mitte, Berlin, Germany.

External links
 

Bridges in Berlin
Buildings and structures in Mitte
Museum Island